The Supreme Court of Guam is the highest judicial body of the United States territory of Guam. The Court hears all appeals from the Superior Court of Guam and exercises original jurisdiction only in cases where a certified question is submitted to it by a U.S. federal court, the Governor of Guam, or the Guam Legislature. The Supreme Court of Guam is the ultimate judicial authority on local matters. In the past, appeals of questions involving the U.S. Constitution or federal laws or treaties were heard by a three-judge appellate panel of the U.S. District Court of Guam, from which appeals could be further taken to the United States Court of Appeals for the Ninth Circuit, but this is no longer the case. Since 2006, the court's decisions have only been appealable to the Supreme Court of the United States, in line with the practice regarding the highest courts of the 50 states. The Court sits in the Monessa G. Lujan Memorial Courtroom, which is on the third floor of the Guam Judicial Center in Hagatna, Guam.

Structure
The Court is composed of three justices who are appointed by the Governor of Guam and confirmed by the Guam Legislature. Justices serve for terms of good behavior, subject to a retention election every ten years after his/her appointment. The three justices issue judgment on all cases brought before them. They all sit on the Judicial Council of Guam, which is ultimately in charge of the administration of the Guam Judiciary.

Current justices
The current justices of the Supreme Court of Guam are:

Robert Torres – Chief Justice
Philip Carbullido – Associate Justice
Katherine Maraman – Associate Justice

The justice's full biographies can be found at the Supreme Court's website

List of Chief Justices

Retired justices

The Superior Court of Guam 
Judges of the Superior Court are appointed by the governor with the advice and consent of the Legislature for a term of eight years. If they wish to continue in office, their names are placed on the ballot at a general election. They must garner at least 50 percent plus one favorable vote of the number of cast ballots to remain in office. Judge Richard Benson and Judge Joaquin E. Manibusan were the first to be placed on a ballot. They both received the overwhelming approval of the voters.

The Superior Court is a court of general jurisdiction, and its seven judges preside over criminal, civil, juvenile, probate, small claims, traffic and child support cases brought before them.  The hearing officer generally does not preside over all of these subjects, but is utilized predominantly in small claims, family, and traffic matters.  In December 2005, the Adult and Juvenile Drug Courts were recognized as courts of record of the Judiciary of Guam. These programs are examples of "therapeutic justice" which focuses on rehabilitation of offenders and their reintegration into society.  Judges are assigned to cases on a rotating basis, though one is rotated into assignment as designated Drug Court judge exclusively for a specified period (currently yearly).  The Presiding Judge's additional responsibility is primarily procedural and administrative concerns, though formerly the "PJ," as the position is commonly referred to, assigned cases to the various judges.

The current Judges of the Superior Court of Guam are:
The Hon. Alberto C. Lamorena III (Presiding Judge)
The Hon. Elyze M. Iriarte
The Hon. Maria T. Cenzon
The Hon. Michael J. Bordallo
The Hon. Vernon P. Perez
The Hon. Arthur R. Barcinas
The Hon. Dana A. Gutierrez
The Hon. Alberto Tolentino

Former Judges include:
The Hon. Paul J. Abbate Jr. (Presiding Judge)
The Hon. Elizabeth Barrett-Anderson
The Hon. Richard Benson
The Hon. James L. Canto II
The Hon. Benjamin J. Cruz. (Elevated to Guam Supreme Court)
The Hon. Judge Ramon V. Diaz
The Hon. Janet Healy-Weeks (Elevated to Guam Supreme Court)
The Hon. Joaquin V.E. Manibusan
The Hon. Joaquin V.E. Manibusan Jr. (Appointed U.S. Magistrate Judge for District Court of Guam)
The Hon. Joaquin C. Perez (Guam’s first Presiding Judge)
The Hon. John Raker
The Hon. Vicente C. Reyes (Guam's first island attorney)
The Hon. Peter C. Siguenza Jr. (Elevated to Guam Supreme Court)
The Hon. Anita A. Sukola
The Hon. Frances Tydingco-Gatewood (Elevated to Guam Supreme Court. Appointed Chief Judge for District Court of Guam)
The Hon. Steven S. Unpingco

See also
District Court of Guam
Politics of Guam

References

External links
 Judiciary of Guam
 

Guam
Government of Guam
1996 establishments in Guam
Courts and tribunals established in 1996